Josephine Johnson Genzabuke is a Member of Parliament in the National Assembly of Tanzania.

Sources

Tanzanian MPs 2005–2010
Living people
Year of birth missing (living people)
Place of birth missing (living people)
21st-century Tanzanian women politicians